Reidar Engell Olsen (born 10 May 1933) was a Norwegian politician for the Labour Party.

He served as a deputy representative to the Parliament of Norway from Telemark during the terms 1969–1973 and 1973–1977. In total he met during 9 days of parliamentary session.

From 1973 to 1979, during Bratteli's Second Cabinet and Nordli's Cabinet, Engell Olsen was appointed State Secretary in the Ministry of Industry. He also served as mayor of Tinn.

References

1933 births
Living people
Norwegian state secretaries
Deputy members of the Storting
Labour Party (Norway) politicians
Mayors of places in Telemark
People from Tinn